Anna Hadija Ali (29 December 1966 – 6 June 2012) was a Kenyan Religious Sister of the Pious Union of the Daughters of Jesus the Good Shepherd. She is known for her claims of personal contact with Jesus Christ in visitations between 1987 and 1991.

Biography

Ali was born in 1966 to a Muslim father and a Roman Catholic mother in Kenya, but was not baptized until 1979. She received a limited education, which was further dampened by ill-health, suffering from continual bleeding of her hands and feet.  While at school, Ali kept secret her desire to be a religious, believing that ill-health would prevent her religious profession. Convinced that she could be healed by Archbishop Emmanuel Milingo, who was a controversial faith healer at the same time he was a ranking prelate of the Roman Catholic Church. Ali went to meet him during his visit to Nairobi in 1983 and claimed that she was indeed cured through his prayer.

Ali was one of the first women to join the Daughters of Jesus, which was founded by Milingo. She made her profession of vows on 7 September 1991 in the chapel of the monastery of the Visitation Order in Rome, Italy.

She stayed at Bishop Cornelius Korir's residence in Eldoret, Kenya, where she shared her mystical experience with other members of the community such as Sergio Perez Estrada and others. For four years she experienced weekly visits from Jesus; and cried bloody tears on Wednesday-Thursday nights according to the testimony of witnesses.

Personal visit claim
In August 1987, at the residence of Milingo, Jesus Christ is said to have first appeared to her. Ali claimed ongoing visits, and that on the feast of Corpus Christi, 1988, he appeared to her in tears of blood and came in His own light. He was enveloped in light, which was of the same hue of the sky when it is deeply blue. His presence illuminated the whole room. He wore a red tunic (the color of blood), with wide sleeves. He has shining dark hair. He gave me a message and on His instruction I started writing down the messages...The first message was written on 8 September 1987  

After this event, more personal visits are said to have followed, in which further divine revelations, (which have been written down, documented, and studied) reiterating the case with mankind:
the betrayal of humanity, and the dragging down of souls to perdition through sinful loves and money;
[that] the time is grave and warnings are not heeded;
the devil has imprisoned souls.

Photographic evidence
During her second anniversary mass in July at Karen-Nairobi, a sign of the Holy Spirit allegedly appeared on her portrait. One piece of evidence for Ali's claims is a photograph allegedly depicting Jesus during one visitation. In subsequent revelations, Jesus gave her his reasons for making himself visible, including the following:

 "Listen to me. I am above this earth. I allow myself to be seen after many warnings"
 "I make myself visible in order to bring back souls."
 "I love mankind and I make myself visible in order to give my warnings of mercy"
 "Many do not listen to me because they do not believe in my reality"

Conference and public reaction
On 15 February 1994 Ali, with Milingo, held a press conference in Rome in which she recounted her experience, and showed her photographic evidence. European media reported on the event, including the British tabloid, News of the World. Her claims of these private revelations have yet to be fully approved by the Catholic Church.

External links
Propheties Mystic Account
Explanation from Visions of Jesus Christ Website 
Profesías de Sor Anna Ali (Spanish)
"An Interview with Sister Anna Hadija Ali" by Father Jude Mbukanma, O.P., 9 September 1991, Digilander Page 

1966 births
2012 deaths
Kenyan Roman Catholic religious sisters and nuns
20th-century Roman Catholic nuns